Trailblazer is a video game that requires the player to direct a ball along a series of suspended passages. It was originally released by Gremlin Graphics for the ZX Spectrum, Commodore 64, Atari 8-bit family, Amstrad CPC, and C16/plus/4 in 1986 (there was also an enhanced version on Amstrad CPC 3" disc). It was ported to the Amiga and Atari ST.

In 2005 a remake for the Gizmondo handheld console was released, and it was also adapted in 2011 for the PS3, PlayStation Portable, PS Vita, and PlayStation TV as part of the Playstation Mini series.

Gameplay

The game can be played either in time trial or arcade mode. Races usually last between 15 and 45 seconds. Special fields on the track let the ball jump (blue), slow down (red), speed up (green) or warp speed the ball (white), invert the controls (cyan/light blue), bounce it backwards (purple) or are holes (black).

Reception

The game was reviewed in 1990 in Dragon #158 by Hartley, Patricia, and Kirk Lesser in "The Role of Computers" column, as part of the Mastertronic MEGA Pack of 10 games previously released in Europe. The reviewers gave the game 5 out of 5 stars, stating "Our favorite on this disk; racing on Cosmic Causeway roads against the clock or against a robot. This one was really fun".

Zzap!64'''s reviewers also enjoyed the game which they thought was "an excellent variation on the race game theme".  The overall rating given was 93%, qualifying the C64 version for the magazine's Sizzler award. Steve Panak, reviewing the Atari 8-bit version for ANALOG Computing, concluded "the game is the most original arcade action wristbuster to come down the pike in a long time, and one of the best two-player competition games I've seen."

ReviewsComputer Gamer (Jun, 1987)Amtix! (Dec, 1986)Your Sinclair (Dec, 1986)Commodore User (Dec, 1986)Computer Gamer (Nov, 1986)Computer Gamer (Dec, 1986)Happy Computer (Nov, 1986)Popular Computing Weekly (Oct 30, 1986)Computer and Video Games (Jun, 1987)Tilt (Jun, 1987)Génération 4 (1987)Australian Commodore and Amiga Review (Feb, 1987)ASM (Aktueller Software Markt) (Dec, 1986)Tilt (Jan, 1987)Computer Gamer'' (Dec, 1986)

References

External links
Trailblazer Hands-On at GameSpot

Trailblazer on thelegacy.de

1986 video games
Amiga games
Amstrad CPC games
Atari 8-bit family games
Atari ST games
Commodore 64 games
Commodore 16 and Plus/4 games
MSX games
ZX Spectrum games
Gremlin Interactive games
Gizmondo games
Mindscape games
Single-player video games
Video games developed in the United Kingdom